Caulerpa dichotoma is a species of seaweed in the Caulerpaceae family.

The seaweed is grass green at the base becoming a darker green.

It is found along the coast in a small area of the Kimberley region of Western Australia.

References

dichotoma
Species described in 1906